Konstantin Matusevich (born 25 January 1971 in Kiev, in the Ukrainian SSR of the Soviet Union) is a retired Ukrainian-born Israeli high jumper. His personal best jump is 2.36 metres, achieved in February 2000, in Perth. This is the current Israeli record.

Achievements

See also
List of Israeli records in athletics
List of Maccabiah records in athletics

References

External links
 

1971 births
Living people
Israeli male high jumpers
Athletes (track and field) at the 1996 Summer Olympics
Athletes (track and field) at the 2000 Summer Olympics
Olympic athletes of Israel
Sportspeople from Kyiv
Ukrainian emigrants to Israel